Romanas is a masculine Lithuanian given name. Notable people with the name include:

Romanas Chodakauskas (1883–1932), Lithuanian military officer
Romanas Januškevičius (born 1953), Lithuanian mathematician
Romanas Plečkaitis (1933–2009), Lithuanian philosopher

Lithuanian masculine given names